The Saab 2000 is a twin-engined high-speed turboprop airliner built by Swedish aircraft manufacturer Saab. Production took place in Linköping in southern Sweden. The Saab 2000 first flew in March 1992 and was certified in 1994. The last aircraft was delivered in April 1999, a total of 63 aircraft being built. By October 2022, 27 Saab 2000s were in airline and military service.

Development and design
In December 1988, Saab decided to build a stretched derivative of its successful Saab 340 twin-turboprop regional airliner. The new aircraft was planned to meet a perceived demand for a high-speed 50-seat turboprop with good climb performance which could operate over short- and medium-range routes with similar block times to jet aircraft while retaining the efficiency provided by turboprop engines. The new airliner, called the Saab 2000, was formally launched in May 1989, with Saab already having firm orders for 46 aircraft and options for a further 147. The aircraft was assembled at Saab's Linköping factory, with major subcontractors including CASA, who built the aircraft's wings, Short Brothers, who built the rear fuselage and Valmet who built the aircraft's tail surfaces. The Saab 2000 first flew on 26 March 1992 and entered into scheduled airline service in September 1994, a few months after its certification by the Joint Aviation Authorities in March and the Federal Aviation Administration in April.

The Saab 2000 has a 15% greater wingspan than the Saab 340, and being  longer can carry up to 58 passengers in a high-density layout and 50 with a more comfortable  seat pitch. One engine was mounted on each wing, as in the 340, with the engines placed further from the fuselage than those of the 340 to reduce cabin noise. The aircraft was designed to operate at a maximum cruise speed of Mach 0.62.

Operational history

Sales of the Saab 2000 were fairly limited. The major initial customer was Crossair, a regional airline which had Swissair as a 56% shareholder. Crossair took delivery of 34 aircraft and retired the type in 2005.

Due to limited demand, Saab ceased production of the Saab 2000 in 1999, with the last aircraft being delivered to Crossair on 29 April of that year. The primary reason for the low sales was the success of newly introduced regional jets such as the Bombardier CRJ and Embraer ERJ 145 family which provided better performance and passenger comfort for the same initial price.

General Motors (GM) operated several corporate-configured Saab 2000s and was in talks with new startup air carrier Pro Air to have this airline operate them in scheduled service as Pro Air Express in the U.S.; however, Pro Air then encountered financial difficulties and ceased all operations before the deal could be consummated.  Air Marshall Islands also operated a Saab 2000 in the remote Micronesia island region of the Pacific Ocean.

Some smaller airlines, including Eastern Airways in the UK, have subsequently acquired 2000s at low cost and operated them on regional routes which experience lower passenger numbers as well on shuttle services in the U.K. for oil and gas personnel working in the North Sea.

In June 2006, Pakistan completed the purchase of six Saab 2000 turboprop aircraft to be equipped with the Saab-Ericsson ERIEYE Airborne Early Warning system. Revised in May 2007 due to renegotiation with the Government of Pakistan, only five aircraft will be delivered, four of which will be equipped with the Erieye system. On 3 April 2008, the first Saab 2000 Erieye AEW&C was rolled out and presented to Pakistan Air Force officials during a ceremony in Sweden.

By 2022 Freight Runners Express / ACE  headquartered in Milwaukee, WI become the largest civilian operator of the 2000.

Variants
 Saab 2000: 50–58 seat regional airliner.
 Saab 2000FI: Flight inspection aircraft for the Japan Civil Aviation Bureau, two produced.
 Saab 2000 AEW&C: Airborne early warning and control variant fitted with Erieye active electronically scanned array radar and associated mission systems.
 Saab 2000 Airtracer: SIGINT aircraft
 Saab 2000 MPA: Maritime patrol aircraft

Operators

Current operators

As of October 2022, a total of 27 Saab 2000s remained in civilian and military service:

 Freight Runners Express / ACE (6)
 Aleutian Airways (2, operated by Sterling Airways)
 Meregrass (2)
 NyxAir (3)
 Pakistan Air Force (10)
 Royal Saudi Air Force (2)
 Saab Group (2)
 Sveaflyg (1, operated by Lipican Aer)
 Swedish Aircraft Holdings (1)
 Wildcat Touring (1)

Former operators

The following airlines formerly operated Saab 2000 aircraft in scheduled passenger service in the past:

 Adria Airways Switzerland
 Air France (operated by CityJet and Regional Airlines)
 Air Marshall Islands
 Blue1
 Braathens Regional
 Carpatair
 Crossair
 Deutsche BA
 Eastern Airways
 Flybe
 FlyLAL
 Golden Air
Loganair
 Malmo Aviation
 Moldavian Airlines
 OLT Express Germany
 PGA Portugália Airlines (operated by OMNI Aviation)
 PenAir
 Polet Airlines
 Scandinavian Airlines (operated by Braathens Regional)
 Scandinavian Commuter (operated by Swelink)
 SkyWork Airlines

Specifications

Accidents and incidents
Between 1999 and 2019, there was 1 hull-loss accident involving Saab 2000 series aircraft, resulting in 1 fatality.

Accidents with fatalities
 On 17 October 2019, PenAir Flight 3296 had a runway overrun while landing at Unalaska Airport in Alaska with 42 occupants on board: 1 person died and 9 were injured. The probable cause was the incorrect wiring of the wheel speed transducer harnesses on the left main landing gear during overhaul, causing the antiskid system to malfunction. Contributing factors were Saab's failing to consider and protect against human error during maintenance, in its design of the harness; the FAA’s lack of consideration of the RSA size, allowing the Saab 2000 to operate at the airport; and the flight crew willingness to land with a tailwind exceeding the airplane's limit due to their plan continuation bias, aggravated by PenAir's failure to apply its qualification policy which allowed the pilot to operate at a challenging airport with limited experience at the airport and in the craft.

Other incidents

 On 8 October 1999, while being taxied by two technicians, the aircraft named "Eir Viking" crashed into closed hangar doors at Arlanda airport in Sweden. The plane was damaged beyond repair.
 On 10 July 2002, Crossair Flight 850, operated with a Saab 2000, was forced to make an emergency landing at Werneuchen Airfield, Germany, as a result of severe weather. One of the sixteen passengers on board suffered minor injuries. The aircraft, registered as HB-IZY, was damaged beyond economic repair when it hit an earth bank placed across the runway, the markings of which did not conform to standards.
On 15 December 2014, Loganair Flight 6780 was struck by lightning while approaching Sumburgh Airport. The flight subsequently suffered from control difficulties and nosedived from 4000 feet to 1000 feet after the crew tried taking over the controls, but failed to notice that the autopilot was still engaged. The pilots then declared a mayday and returned to Aberdeen Airport. There were 33 occupants onboard and no injuries were reported. The subsequent investigation discovered that the planes' autopilot could not be overriden by pilot input, making it unique among all other aircraft in service.

See also

References

Further reading

 Magnusson, Michael. Saab 340 & Saab 2000 – The Untold Story. Stockholm, Sweden: Aviatic Förlag, 2014.

External links

 Saab Aircraft Leasing

2000
1990s Swedish airliners
Low-wing aircraft
Aircraft first flown in 1992
Twin-turboprop tractor aircraft